"It's Too Funky in Here" is a song recorded by James Brown. Released as a single in May 1979, it charted #15 R&B. It also appeared on the album The Original Disco Man. Critic Robert Christgau praised the song as the "disco disc of the year".

Live performances of the song appear on the albums Hot On the One, Live in New York, and Live at Chastain Park.

References

James Brown songs
1979 singles
Songs written by Brad Shapiro